The third series of Junior Bake Off began airing on 2 November 2015 on CBBC, with Sam Nixon and Mark Rhodes replacing Aaron Craze as hosts, and Allegra McEvedy and Graham Hornigold taking over from Mary Berry and James Martin as judges. This was Hornigold’s only series as a judge. Amari won that series.

Contestants
 Quarterfinalist
 Semi-Finalist
 Finalist
 Winner

Episodes

Episode 1 Heat A

Episode 2 Heat B

Episode 3 Heat C

Episode 4 Heat D

Episode 5 Heat E

Episode 6 Heat F

Episode 7 Heat G

Episode 8 Heat H

Episode 9 Heat I

Episode 10 Heat J

Episode 11: Quarter-Finals part 1

Episode 12: Quarter-Final part 2

Episode 13 Semi Finals

Episode 14 Finals part 1

Episode 15 Finals part 2

Ratings

References

External links
 

The Great British Bake Off
2015 British television seasons